David Miles (c. 1871 – October 28, 1915) was an American actor and director. Born in Milford, Connecticut, he became a Hollywood actor, and he later owned David Miles, Inc., "a motion picture manufacturing company" based in Los Angeles, California. He died of tuberculosis in New York City, at age 44.

Partial filmography

As actor
All 1909 shorts, unless otherwise noted.

 The Helping Hand
 The Maniac Cook
 The Honor of Thieves
 Love Finds a Way
 A Rural Elopement
 The Criminal Hypnotist
 The Welcome Burglar
 The Cord of Life
 The Girls and Daddy
 The Brahma Diamond
 Edgar Allen Poe
 A Wreath in Time
 Tragic Love
 The Joneses Have Amateur Theatricals
 His Wife's Mother
 The Politician's Love Story
 At the Altar
 The Prussian Spy
 The Wooden Leg
 The Roue's Heart
 The Voice of the Violin
 The Deception
 And a Little Child Shall Lead Them
 A Burglar's Mistake
 A Drunkard's Reformation
 Trying to Get Arrested
 The Road to the Heart
 Lucky Jim
 Lady Helen's Escapade
 Two Memories
 The Cricket on the Hearth
 The Violin Maker of Cremona
 The Lonely Villa
 An Outcast Among Outcasts (1912 short)

As director
 The Closed Bible (1912 short)
 The Scarlet Letter (1913 short)

References

External links

1870s births
1915 deaths
20th-century American male actors
20th-century deaths from tuberculosis
American film directors
Male actors from Los Angeles
People from Milford, Connecticut
Tuberculosis deaths in New York (state)